Magnus Johannesen (born 2 February 2002) is a badminton player from Denmark.

Achievements

BWF International Challenge/Series (2 titles, 4 runners-up) 
Men's singles

  BWF International Challenge tournament
  BWF International Series tournament
  BWF Future Series tournament

References

External links 
 

2002 births
Living people
Sportspeople from Aalborg
Danish male badminton players